Zuber is an unincorporated community in Marion County, Florida, United States.  It is located near the intersection of State Road 326 and County Road 25A.  Its commerce is supported by its proximity to Interstate 75. 
 
The community is part of the Ocala Metropolitan Statistical Area.

Ruby McCollum was born in Zuber.

Geography

References

Unincorporated communities in Marion County, Florida
Unincorporated communities in Florida